Arak is a village in the commune of In Amguel, in Tamanrasset District, Tamanrasset Province, Algeria. It is located on the N1 national highway about halfway between In Salah and Tamanrasset, near the Arak gorges.

References

Neighbouring towns and cities

Populated places in Tamanrasset Province